Jimbo Wallace is an upright and electric bass player, vocalist, and songwriter in the psychobilly and rockabilly genres. He has played bass in the Reverend Horton Heat band since 1989. He is the most-tattooed member of the band.

He plays using the percussive rockabilly/psychobilly bass technique known as slap bass, in which the strings are pulled away from the fingerboard until they snap back, and the strings are rhythmically slapped against the fingerboard. The German rockabilly bassist Didi Beck cites Wallace as one of his influences.

Concert reviews take note of the stunts that Wallace does with the bass, such as throwing it into the air or playing it on its side while Heath stands on top of it and plays guitar.
He has a signature tiger-striped upright bass manufactured by King Double Basses. He  has been an endorser for Gallien-Krueger bass amplifiers. On stage, he uses a 4x10" cabinet and a 1x15" cabinet with a GK amp.

Discography
This discography is from AllMusic 
2013; Discovery Vaults; The Reverend Horton Heat; Bass (Electric), Bass (Upright), Vocals (Background)
2013; White People & the Damage Done; Jello Biafra & the Guantanamo School of Medicine; upright Slap Bass
2012; 25 to Life; The Reverend Horton Heat; Composer
2009; Laughin' & Cryin' with the Reverend Horton Heat; The Reverend Horton Heat; Bass (Upright)
2008; Psychobilly Christmas; Bass (Upright)
2006; 20th Century Masters - The Millennium Collection: The Best of the Reverend Horton Heat; The Reverend Horton Heat; Composer, Guitar (Bass), Main Personnel, Vocals (Background)
2005; We Three Kings; The Reverend Horton Heat; Bass (Upright), Guitar, Main Personnel, Vocals (Background)
2004; Revival; The Reverend Horton Heat; Bass, Guitar (Bass), Member of Attributed Artist
2002; Lucky 7; The Reverend Horton Heat; Bass (Electric), Bass (Upright), Vocals (Background)
2000; Spend a Night in the Box; The Reverend Horton Heat; Bass, Vocals
1999; Holy Roller; The Reverend Horton Heat; Bass, Composer, Vocals
1999; IFC: In Your Ear, Vol. 1; Composer
1999; Mustache; Mustache; Bass
1999; Rebel Heart, Vol. 6; Gene Vincent; Bass
1998; Space Bunnies Must Die!; Composer
1998; Space Heater; The Reverend Horton Heat; Bass, Composer
1996; It's Martini Time; The Reverend Horton Heat; Composer
1996; Rebel Heart, Vol. 3; Gene Vincent; Bass
1994; Liquor in the Front; The Reverend Horton Heat; Composer
1993; The Full Custom Gospel Sounds; The Reverend Horton Heat; Bass, Bass (Upright), Vocals
1990; Smoke 'Em If You Got 'Em; The Reverend Horton Heat; Bass, Bass (Upright), Composer, Vocals

References

External links
Jimbo Wallace on Twitter
Google image gallery for Wallace

American double-bassists
Male double-bassists
American bass guitarists
Living people
Year of birth missing (living people)
Slap bassists (double bass)
21st-century double-bassists
21st-century American male musicians
The Reverend Horton Heat members